Stuart Ritchie (born September 10, 2001) is an American soccer player who currently plays as a left-back for MLS Next Pro side Columbus Crew 2.

Career

Youth
Ritchie joined his local club side Ballistic United aged five-year's old, where he stayed until 2016. Ritchie spent a season with the San Jose Earthquakes academy, before move to Dutch side FC Groningen in January 2018. Ritchie played one season with the Groningen U17's before moving up to the U19 team. He would transition into the U23 team, as well as spending time training with the first team squad. In the summer of 2019, Ritchie moved to German side Hannover 96, where he a played with the team's U19 side, before earning a professional contract with the team's U23 side. Ritchie appeared on the bench for Hannover 96 II in a Regionalliga fixture in 2019.

Richmond Kickers
On January 25, 2022, it was announced Ritchie had returned to the United States and signed with USL League One club Richmond Kickers. He debuted for the club on April 2, 2022, starting in a 4–0 win over FC Tucson.

References

2001 births
Living people
American soccer players
American expatriate soccer players
American expatriate soccer players in Germany
American expatriate sportspeople in the Netherlands
Association football defenders
Expatriate footballers in the Netherlands
FC Groningen players
Hannover 96 players
People from Pleasanton, California
Richmond Kickers players
Columbus Crew 2 players
Soccer players from California
United States men's under-20 international soccer players
United States men's youth international soccer players
USL League One players